Harrana (named after Qasr Kharana, an archeological Umayyad desert palace in the area) is part of the Jordan eastern plateau some 60 kilometers southeast of Amman city.

The area is largely uninhabited except for seasonal Bedouin sheep and camel herders who bring their livestock to the area during December through April.

Harrana's climate, much like most of Jordan, is influenced by the moderate Mediterranean climate from the west, the very hot Sahara's climate from the east, and the cold European climate from the north.

Though arid, the area is rich in animal life. Birds, owls, rodents, rabbits, foxes, occasional wolves and hyenas, snakes, and lizards are some of the animals that take refuge in Harrana. A variety of flowering plants bloom during late winter and early spring months, including mustard plants, oriental poppies, and wild irises. Cistanche tubulosa, or the desert broomrape, is another resident in Harrana blooming towards the end of spring and beginning of summer.

Mosasaur specimens along with their remarkably well preserved scale imprints have been discovered from late Maastrichtian deposits of the Muwaqqar Chalk Marl Formation of Harrana The best preserved and complete specimens of the extinct teleostean fish genus Saurocephalus and the most complete mosasaur Carinodens remains come from the latest Maastrichtian of Harrana.

References 

Archaeological sites in Jordan
Regions of Jordan
Cretaceous paleontological sites of Asia